The PrJSC MHP (PrJSC «MHP») is a leading international food & agrotech company with headquarters in Kyiv, Ukraine. It is the leading producer of poultry and culinary products in Ukraine and one of the leaders in poultry production and meat processing in the Balkans through its Perutnina Ptuj facilities. The MHP company is also one of the largest grain producers in Ukraine a leading processed-meat producer in Ukraine and the leading biogas producer in Ukraine.

The MHP owns and operates a number of food brands, including domestic "Nasha Ryaba", "Apetytna", "Lehko!", "Bashchynskyi", "LaStrava", "Skott Smeat", "RyabChick", "Home style chicken", "Ukrainian Chicken","Kurator", and international food brands "Qualiko", "Sultanah", "Assilah", “Al-Hassanat” and other.

Overview 
The founder and the CEO of MHP is Yuriy Kosiuk.

Ukraine 
MHP has the greatest market share and highest brand recognition for its products. MHP owns and operates each of the key stages of chicken production processes, from feed grains and fodder production to egg hatching and grow out to processing, marketing, distribution and sales (including through MHP's franchise outlets). Complete vertical integration practically eliminates MHP's exposure to raw material price fluctuations since its grain production exceeds internal consumption requirements, allowing the company to be an important participant in the international commodity trade. In addition to cost efficiency, vertical integration also enables MHP to maintain strict biosecurity and to control the quality of its inputs and the resulting quality and consistency of its products all the way to the point of sale. To support its sales, MHP maintains a distribution network consisting of nine distribution and logistical centers within major Ukrainian cities. MHP uses its own truck fleet to distribute its products, reducing overall transportation costs and delivery times. MHP also has a leading grain cultivation business growing corn, soya and sunflower to support the vertical integration of its chicken production and increasingly other grains, such as wheat and rape, for sale to third parties. MHP leases agricultural land located primarily in the highly fertile black soil regions of Ukraine.

The Balkans 
In July 2019, the Serbian Commission for Protection of Competition has allowed MHP to acquire Slovenian Perutnina Ptuj (PP). PP is one of leading companies, poultry & meat-processing producer in the Balkans, with production sites in four Balkan countries: Slovenia, Croatia, Serbia, Bosnia and Herzegovina. PP owns distribution companies in Austria, Macedonia and Romania and supplies products to fifteen countries in Europe. PP is vertically integrated across all states of chicken meat production - feed, hatching eggs production and hatching, breeding, slaughtering, sausage production and further poultry processing.

Operations 
The Group is organized into and operates through four business segments: Poultry and Related Operations; Grain Growing Operations; Meat-Processing and Other Agricultural Operations; and the European Operating Segment

The Poultry & Related Operations Segment produces, processes and sells chicken meat (fresh and frozen), culinary products (marinated, ready-to-cook and value-added products), vegetable oils (sunflower and soybean), and mixed fodder. It includes three chicken meat complexes, two breeding complexes, three sunflower oil plants, one soybean crushing plant, three feed mills and two biogas complexes.

Grain growing: MHP is one of the leading grain cultivation businesses in Ukraine. The Segment grows corn, sunflower and soybean as well as other grains including rape and wheat, both for fodder production to support the vertical integration of its chicken production, and to export for sale to third parties, thereby providing one of the group's sources of hard currency revenue. MHP leases agricultural land located primarily in the highly fertile black soil regions of Ukraine. In 2021 MHP's total landbank constituted approximately 361,000 hectares of land.

The Meat-Processing & Other Agricultural Operations Segment produces and sells sausage, salami, convenience foods and produce from cattle and dairy operations. It incorporates two facilities for the production of prepared meat products, a number of cattle farms and a beef processing facility (Scott Smeat, acquired in 2021). The meat-processing operations are the Segment's core business and an important driver of the segment's profitability. MHP is a leader in the highly fragmented meat-processing market in Ukraine, accounting for approximately 14% of all sausage and cooked meat produced in Ukraine in 2021, with some non-branded processed-meat products exported.

Transformation to a culinary company. 
MHP is transforming from a raw materials provider to an international culinary company. This evolution reflects the accelerating changes in the food production landscape as consumer preferences shift to sustainable food choices, and higher value-added and further processed products such as those in ready-to-cook and ready-to-eat ranges.

MHP made significant progress towards its strategic transformation goal both in product development and routes to market. In the domestic market (Ukraine), MHP invested around US$6 million to establish a new facility - Culinary Centre in Kyiv, which was opened in summer 2021. It covers 1,000m2, with facilities for new food product development, testing of recipe ingredients and products, sensory analysis and production of ready-to-eat and ready-to-heat products.

The rollout of the own “Myasomarket”, convenience stores and street food kiosks “Döner market” continued. The focus on changing consumer preferences and on the sale of value-added food (including ready-to-eat and ready-to-heat products), sold from stores close to the consumer, is a new concept for the Ukrainian market, which the MHP team has largely been developing during 2021. Including the acquisition of Lubnym`yaso LLC, a Ukrainian meat production plant, producer and seller of beef under the trade mark Scott Smeat.

Impacts of MHP operations 
MHP's responsible business strategy is closely aligned with the UN SDGs and the Group aims to contribute constructively to positive global change.

As one of the biggest agricultural producer, MHP has its facilities in Vinnytsya, Cherkasy, Dnipropetrovska, Ivano-Frankivsk Oblasts in Ukraine and in the EU in Slovenia and the Netherlands. The most adverse impacts associated with the company's facilities work are smell of manure, air, water, and soil pollution, as well as negative impacts of company's traffic on the local areas.

In order to minimize the impacts of operations the Group employs a business models which support the circular economy and the elimination of waste in the poultry production process. At each stage of production, the waste and by-products are taken and converted into products that are either used by the Group directly or sold to third parties: manure is used to produce biogas, electricity and organic fertiliser; and granulated husks to produce clean energy, used at production sites to replace gas, and fresh bedding for chicken rearing.

MHP Eco energy 
The company was founded in 2011. Since 2012, the company has been implementing and managing sustainable energy projects including biogas complex development and exploitation.

Biogas Complexes 
In the spring of 2012 MHP began works on construction of the first biogas station on Oril-Leader poultry farm in the Dnipropetrovsk region. Already in December 2012 the company put the first fermenter into operation. In 2013 the biogas station which power was 5 MWh has been launched. At the end of 2014, the biogas plant reached its full capacity. At the end of 2019, the first stage of the Biogas Ladyzhyn complex was commissioned by Vinnytsia Poultry Farm LLC with an energy capacity of 12 MWh. This is the first biogas plant in Europe of such capacity and level of technology, which operates on chicken manure and waste from a broiler chicken processing complex.

International organizations have confirmed the effectiveness and relevance of the project in terms of environmental and safety standards. The MHP Eco Energy aims to develop and increase the efficiency of biomethane production technologies and to integrate the technology of production and biomethanization of green hydrogen as a part of a scientific consortium of the European Biogas Association.

Organic biofertilizers

Another important product of biogas complexes is organic biofertilizers, which have a high content of nutrients necessary for plants. The advantages of such organic fertilizers produced at biogas complexes of MHP are numerous, including: versatility; increasing the humus content; improvement of water and air regimes of soils; a full range of essential NPK (nitrogen, phosphorus, and potassium), macro- and microelements, organic compounds that improve the structure of the soil, and humic acids.

MHP continues to lead the industry in green energy pioneering a sustainable agriculture model through new technologies like biogas and other alternative energy sources.

Water pollution and risks of disappearance of water 
One of the MHP's main environmental priorities is to reduce the consumption of water. All of MHP's water use is regularly monitored and metering units are subject to regular inspection and maintenance. Despite the increase in poultry production by 3% and the expansion of the Group, in 2021 there was a reduction in water use in Ukraine in 2021.

MHP is also constantly working on developing the use of leading technology in its treatment of wastewater. In Ukraine, during 2021, the quality of treated water discharged fully complied with the required regulatory standards. All MHP enterprises strictly adhere to current regulatory requirements.

In media there was a discussion on one of the MHP facilities are located near Kaniv, Cherkaska Oblast. Activists claimed that water utilized and contaminated during the production process flowed to Rosava river. Research of MHP with Cherkasy State Technological University found no pollution caused by MHP in the river near its operations in Cherkasy oblast.

Cherkasy University has modern labs, and its students undergo internships at leading enterprises of the Cherkasy region and Ukraine.

Furthermore, MHP installed modern wastewater treatment facilities, manufactured by the Dutch producer Nijhuis Water Technologies. The company facilities in the region are subjected to state supervision, which is carried out by the State Environmental Inspectorate of Ukraine and the State Consumer Service of the Cherkasy region. In addition, full-time ecologists and the laboratory that operates at MHP's sewage treatment plants carry out internal control.

Community development 
MHP works with a wide variety of stakeholders to enable effective community development through financial and “in-kind” contributions. MHP's activities include volunteering and the provision of products and services, as well as providing material assets such as medicines and food.

In 2021, the MHP - Hromady Charitable Foundation was renamed and is now called the MHP - Hromady Sustainable Development Fund (“the Fund”). This is to reflect the sustainable development aims of the organisation Благодійний фонд МХП Громаді. During 2021, the Fund made community investments of UAH 108 million in partnership with other organizations such as the ISAR “Unity”, Zagoriy Foundation.

The work of the Fund has four areas of focus:

 Micro-grant awards for community initiatives and micro-business to create a powerful platform for community, business and government interaction;
 Support for cultural, and educational projects to strengthen the national identity of the Ukrainian people;
 Support for environmental projects to draw public attention to the importance of environmental protection and conservation; and
 Support for public health: The Doctor for the Village project is often the only opportunity for people to receive quality medical services in more remote areas of Ukraine.

Open-Air Cinema

This is the first large-scale national tour of Ukrainian cinema. In 2021, it visited 43 settlements (villages and small towns) where there is no access to cinemas.

Micro-grant competitions

Time to go Ukraine! Micro-grants for community development were awarded to help solve social problems in villages and small towns. The projects generally support local civic initiatives. 93 projects from 12 regions of Ukraine became winners and received grants of up to UAH 50,000.

Village steps to development

This is a competition to select micro-grants for projects aiming to stimulate small and microentrepreneurship in rural areas. 24 winning projects from the Cherkasy and Vinnytsia regions were selected and were granted UAH 50,000. 11 entrepreneurs started their own businesses, and 13 other projects were supported. The project is supported by the United Nations Development Programme in Ukraine within the framework of the Partnership for Sustainable Development project.

Green planet with MHP This project aims to support the creation of parks, squares and green spaces within local communities through tree planting. The project has been running for two years. 17,000 tree seedlings were planted in 2020, and a further 16,400 tree seedlings in 2021.

MHP operations and Russian full-scale invasion to Ukraine 
Since the beginning of the full-scale war on February 24, 2022, the company has been facing significant logistical and infrastructure challenges in Ukraine. While MHP continued commercial sales in Ukraine since the war began, export sales have ceased as a result of ports being closed, while export delivery by truck remained practically impossible.

During March and April, MHP team has been developing alternative logistic routes for exports, so that insignificant volumes have been delivered outside of Ukraine. Driven by restricted sales both inside and outside of the country, MHP had to decrease poultry capacity utilization to 80-85%

Due to shelling by the occupying forces on March 12, in the village of Kvitneve (Kyiv region), a fire broke out in a warehouse (rented by the сompany, two buildings) where frozen MHP chicken meat products were stored. As a result of the fire, over 3,000 tonnes of poultry products were lost. The facility was one of the largest warehouses for storage of frozen products in Ukraine and was predominantly used by large local retail chains. As hostilities in the Donetsk region intensified, in April, MHP decided to temporarily suspend operations of the “Ukrainian Bacon” (meatprocessing operations, c.34,000 tonnes annual capacity, Kramatorsk district, Donetsk region). As of the date of the report release, the facility has not been damaged and is under MHP control. Currently, MHP has a key responsibility in the food security of Ukraine and it has continued its operations despite significant difficulties and disruptions. The company continues providing humanitarian aid (mainly through food supply) to the population of Ukraine since the beginning of the war and working hard to manage logistical challenges across all regions of Ukraine. Since the war began, the company has provided around 11,000 tonnes of free-of-charge poultry products, other food, equipment, cars, diesel and different materials as part of its humanitarian mission.

Support of International Finance Institutions to MHP

MHP is a client of large international finance institutions, namely EBRD, EIB, IFC. These international institutions use public money of their member countries to stimulate economy of developing countries like Ukraine by providing loans to sustainable businesses. These institutions have their policies requiring their finding to comply with social, environmental, transparency, and other norms. In 2019 EBRD announced that they stopped funding MHP business after MHP used a loophole in the EU-Ukraine Association agreement and exporting chicken filet beyond adopted quotas. In 2018, communities affected by MHP's Vinnytsia poultry farm filed a complaint with the IFC and the EBRD. The complaint has led to an ongoing mediation process between the parties to the conflict, which is mostly confidential.

References

External links
 

Food retailers of Ukraine
Poultry companies
Agriculture companies of Ukraine
Brand name poultry meats
Companies based in Kyiv Oblast
Food manufacturers of Ukraine
Frozen food brands
Meat processing in Ukraine
Ukrainian companies established in 1998
Food and drink companies established in 1998